"Baby Let's Play House" is a song written by Arthur Gunter and recorded by him in 1954 on the Excello Records label and covered by Elvis Presley the following year on Sun Records.
A line from the song ("I'd rather see you dead, little girl, than to be with another man") was borrowed by John Lennon for his Beatles song Run for Your Life, released on Rubber Soul in 1965.

Elvis Presley version
Elvis' version differs greatly from the original: Elvis started the song with the chorus, where Gunter began with the first verse, and he replaced Gunter's line "You may get religion" with the words "You may have a Pink Cadillac", referring to his custom-painted '55 Cadillac auto that had also been serving as the band's transportation at the time.

Baby Let's Play House was on the fourth issue of a Presley record by Sun, and became the first song recorded by Elvis to appear on a national chart when it made #5 on the Billboard Country Singles chart in July 1955. Elvis's version also starts out with Elvis introducing the lyric-stutter to the music pundits. These lyrics and melodies are not found in the original Arthur Gunter version.

Personnel
 Elvis Presley - lead vocals, acoustic rhythm guitar
 Scotty Moore - electric lead guitar
 Bill Black - double bass

Charts

Weekly charts

Notable cover versions
In July 1956, the Johnny Burnette Trio released "Oh Baby Babe" (Coral 9–61675) which, though credited to "J. Burnette, D. Burnette, P. Burlison, A. Mortimer", was "Baby Let's Play House" with altered lyrics.
 Buddy Holly did a cover on his album, Holly in the Hills
In 2008, a Spankox remix of the song made #84 in the UK.
In 2022, Austin Butler did a cover of the song for Baz Luhrmann's Elvis, which samples Gary Clark Jr.'s & Junkie XL cover song "Come Together".

References

External links
 Arthur Gunter version
 Elvis Presley version

1954 songs
1955 singles
Elvis Presley songs
Buddy Holly songs
The Newbeats songs
RCA Victor singles
Rockabilly songs